Latrinalia is a type of deliberately inscribed or etched marking made on latrines; that is, bathrooms or lavatory walls. It can take the form of art, drawings, or words, including poetry and personal reflections. Other types of latrinalia include political commentary and notes on love as well as derogatory (sharing low opinions) comments and pictures. When done without the property owner's consent, it constitutes vandalism. Some venues have attempted to curb such vandalism by installing in the lavatory large blackboards and providing free chalk; it is hoped that patrons will avail themselves of the blackboard and chalk rather than applying their latrinalia directly to the walls or toilet stalls.

Study and etymology
An important work in the study of latrinalia is Allen Walker Read's Lexical Evidence from Folk Epigraphy in Western North America: A Glossarial Study of the Low Element in the English Vocabulary. The work describes and collates examples of graffiti observed by Reade on a road trip throughout the Western United States in 1928. It was privately published in Paris in 1935 since its description of bathroom graffiti was considered too racy for American publishers. It was eventually published in the United States in 1977, under the title Classic American Graffiti. The work was described as a classic "model study" of latrinalia that "deserves the attention of any serious student of American language" in a 1979 review, which noted that even then it remained hard to access and "excessively rare."

The late Alan Dundes, a folklorist at University of California, Berkeley, coined the term latrinalia in 1966 to refer to graffiti found in restrooms. Dundes preferred it over the term shithouse poetry, as not all latrinalia is in verse or poetic form.

The word is derived from the compounding of latrine (or toilet) and the suffix -analia, which signifies a worthless collection of something — in this case bathroom writings.

See also
Graffiti
Servít je vůl
Toilet humour
Vandalism

Bibliography
Joseph Gelfer, The Little Book of Toilet Graffiti
Jim Morrison, Privy Thoughts: Some Toilet Graffiti Found On University Bathroom Doors

References

External links
From The Bathroom Wall - A blog about bathroom graffiti and other humorous topics  OFFLINE 2 Sep 2022
Latrinalia (e Bathroom Graffiti) — Electronic Bathroom Graffiti uploads from around the world.
Bathroom Graffiti — Bathroom Graffiti by author and photographer Mark Ferem 
Bathroom Graffiti Project — features and rates hundreds of photos of latrinalia from around the world
Latrinalia — features galleries of bathroom graffiti
Raina Williams, Content analysis: Latrinalia, Department of Psychology, University of California, Davis
Mark Ferem, Latrinalia: "It's all in The Head", 50mm Los Angeles
Matt Schneider, Stall Wall, an ethnography on latrinalia
 Origins of Bathroom Graffiti Documentary
 The Writing on the Stall

Graffiti and unauthorised signage
Writing